Johnny de Vries (born 20 February 1990 in Appelscha) is a Dutch professional footballer who plays as a midfielder. He formerly played for FC Emmen, on loan from SC Heerenveen and for SC Cambuur.

Honours

Club
SC Cambuur
Eerste Divisie (1): 2012–13

External links
 Voetbal International profile 

1990 births
Living people
Dutch footballers
FC Emmen players
SC Cambuur players
Eerste Divisie players
People from Ooststellingwerf
Sportspeople from Friesland
Association football midfielders